Dorcadion ossae is a species of beetle in the family Cerambycidae. It was described by Heyrovský in 1941. It is known from Greece.

References

ossae
Beetles described in 1941